The Ministry of Tourism (Krasuong Tesachar) is a government ministry of Cambodia.

The current Minister of Tourism is Dr. Thong Khon.

See also
Government of Cambodia

References

External links
 Ministry of Tourism of Cambodia

Tourism
Law of Cambodia
Phnom Penh
Cambodia
Cambodia